Elections to Newcastle-under-Lyme Borough Council were held on 6 May 1999.  One third of the council was up for election and the Labour party kept overall control of the council.

After the election, the composition of the council was
Labour 36
Liberal Democrat 12
Conservative 7
Others 1

Election result

References
1999 Newcastle-under-Lyme election result

1999
1999 English local elections
1990s in Staffordshire